Rameez Junaid and David Pel were the defending champions but chose not to defend their title.

Luca Margaroli and Adil Shamasdin won the title after defeating Gerard Granollers and Pedro Martínez 7–5, 6–7(6–8), [14–12] in the final.

Seeds

Draw

References

External links
 Main draw

Firenze Tennis Cup - Doubles